Fugitive Strike Force is a 2006 television series resembling Fox Broadcasting Company's program Cops. The series shows footage of alleged criminals being arrested by three different corps, the U.S. Marshals, the SWAT and bounty hunters.

Episodes

Cast
Rob Dixon - North Las Vegas SWAT
Sean Sprague - North Las Vegas SWAT
Gary Nellis - North Las Vegas SWAT
Eric Rockwell - North Las Vegas SWAT
Dave Jacks - North Las Vegas SWAT
Jeff Pollard - North Las Vegas SWAT
John "J.K." Kozisek - US Marshal
Frank Castiglia - US Marshal
Dave Diliberti - US Marshal
Joe Gardener - US Marshal
Jason Pollock - Las Vegas Bounty Hunter
Joe Intiso - Las Vegas Bounty Hunter
Russell Stoll - Las Vegas Bounty Hunter
Bob Kinsey - Las Vegas Bounty Hunter
Jeff Tabor - Las Vegas Metropolitan Police Officer

External links 
 

2000s American reality television series
2006 American television series debuts
2006 American television series endings
2000s American crime television series
Discovery Channel original programming
Television series by Original Productions